Lillywhites is a sports retailer based at Piccadilly Circus, London, United Kingdom. It is a division of Frasers Group.

History
In the 19th century, several members of the Lillywhite family were leading cricketers; another, Fred Lillywhite, organised the first overseas tour by an England team to North America in 1859. In 1866, the Lillywhite "No. 5" football was chosen for a London v. Sheffield challenge match organised by The Football Association; the same model in the early years of the FA Cup and was the ancestor of the International Football Association Board's modern ball specifications. In 1886, the Ivy League chose the Lillywhite "No. J" as the standard for American college footballs.

The shop has been based at its current location of 25 Regent St. on Piccadilly Circus since 1925, catering to the London market with specialist departments for croquet and real tennis. In 1930, Messrs Lillywhite Ltd. supplied pilot Amy Johnson with her flying kit. Lillywhites' policy was to compete on quality products (which were charged at premium prices). For many years the company was owned by Forte Group. Until 2002, Lillywhites also had locations in other major cities in the United Kingdom including Leeds, Newcastle upon Tyne and Nottingham, with the Leeds store being a very large five storey building that opened in 1996 on The Headrow in the former Schofields department store. In the same year, Lillywhites was bought by the Portuguese company Jerónimo Martins. Lillywhites lost its royal warrant in 2003.

Sports World
In the face of competition from other retailers offering more goods at lower prices, Lillywhites fell into financial difficulty. In 2002 Jerónimo Martins sold the company to Sports World International, the owner of the Sports World retail chain, and some of the outlying stores were rebranded as Sports World. A number of exceptions to this are the branches at Rotherham Retail Park, Lakeside Shopping Centre in West Thurrock, Essex, Dalton Park, Murton and Clarks Village, Street, Whiteley and The Glades, Bromley. The store in Leeds city centre was closed in 2004. The Lakeside branch was closed in 2010 and The Glades, Bromley store was closed in 2012.

References

External links
Official site

Shops in London
Retail companies established in 1925
Sporting goods retailers of the United Kingdom
1925 establishments in England
Sports Direct